The Sidney Myer Music Bowl is an outdoor bandshell performance venue in Melbourne, Victoria, Australia. It is located in the lawns and gardens of Kings Domain on Linlithgow Avenue close to the Arts Centre and the Southbank entertainment precinct. It was officially opened by the Prime Minister of Australia, Robert Menzies, on 12 February 1959, with an audience of 30,000 people. It is listed on the Victorian Heritage Register.

History
The businessman and philanthropist Sidney Myer inspired the construction of the building after attending the Hollywood Bowl in Los Angeles. A violinist who enjoyed music, Myer established free open-air concerts with the Melbourne Symphony Orchestra in 1929, which were always well attended by Melburnians. These free concerts continue to this day, now being held at the bowl itself. There are usually three or four concerts a year.

Upon his death in 1934, the Sidney Myer Fund was established to continue the tradition of philanthropy begun by its founder. The design and construction of a music bowl for the people of Melbourne was decided upon and funded by the fund.

The venue was officially opened by the Australian prime minister, Robert Menzies, on 12 February 1959, and was attended by an audience of 30,000. Later that month over 70,000 people attended to hear the American evangelist Billy Graham. 

The largest crowd ever for a concert event in Australia was The Seekers 1967 homecoming concert at the Sidney Myer Music Bowl which an estimated 200,000 people attended. The 2007 Guinness Book of World Records lists it as the greatest attendance at a concert in the Southern Hemisphere in history. This attendance is also included in The Australian Book of Records. Melburnians were celebrating the annual Moomba Festival, a free community festival, and many thousands were enjoying other attractions but are included in the crowd estimate. Since then, international performers have included: ABBA, AC/DC, Metallica, Wings, Blondie, the Beach Boys, Crowded House, Dire Straits, Neil Diamond, Jason Ngam, Bob Dylan, the Czech Philharmonic Orchestra, Merle Haggard, Pearl Jam, the Electric Light Orchestra, Paul McCartney, Midnight Oil, INXS, R.E.M., Kiri Te Kanawa, Daft Punk, Red Hot Chili Peppers and, in more recent times, Bon Jovi, Guns N' Roses, Soundgarden, Tool, Kanye West, Paramore, Neil Young, Lenny Kravitz, Swedish House Mafia, blink-182, the Black Keys, Lorde, Afrojack, KSHMR, Will Sparks, Timmy Trumpet, Carnage, Axwell, The Cat Empire, Guns N' Roses & The Chainsmokers.

In 1980, administration of the bowl was handed over to the Victorian Arts Centre from the Sidney Myer Fund by Ken Myer, Sidney Myer's son. In 1984 a temporary ice-skating rink was created on the bowl's stage for use during winter months. The venue was closed for a major renovation in 2000 to bring the facilities up to an appropriate standard, and was reopened by the Premier of Victoria, Steve Bracks, at Carols by Candlelight on Christmas Eve, 2002. Recent works on the lawns extending from the seating and stage, and the construction of a fence and gates has reduced the total capacity to a little over 12,000.

50th anniversary celebrations
In 2009, the 50th anniversary of the Sidney Myer Music Bowl was celebrated. The Arts Centre put together a four-day commemorative program of free events. From 12 to 15 February, the festivities featured two concerts from the Melbourne Symphony Orchestra, including a recreation of their 1959 opening concert of the bowl and a romantic Valentine's Day program; a salute to 50 years of rock and roll at the bowl from RocKwiz and an afternoon picnic of family entertainment. There was also an informative exhibition at the St Kilda Road Foyer Gallery of the Arts Centre and a commemorative website depicting 50 years of the bowl.

Design and construction

The bowl's canopy consists of a thin membrane made out of half an inch of weather-proofed plywood sheeted on both sides with aluminium attached to a cobwebbed frame of steel cables and supported by  masts pivoted to the earth. Longitudinal cables hold up the roof and transverse cables hold it down.

Project design was by Yuncken Freeman and Griffiths and Simpson during 1956. The project architect was Barry Patten. Construction commenced in 1958 with an innovative system of cables laced together and covered with aluminium faced plywood sandwich panels. To ensure the structure would be watertight yet aerodynamically stable and flexible, new construction techniques were developed. Ground anchors were required to be corrosion resistant. The shell also needed to be acoustically correct. Construction entailed input from a number of engineering and scientific organisations including the Aeronautical Research Laboratories and Commonwealth Scientific and Industrial Research Organisation (CSIRO) Forest Products Division.

Unlike the Hollywood Bowl's concrete shell structure in Los Angeles which inspired it, the Sidney Myer Music Bowl combined a tensile structural system with a free-form roof. The structural design predates by nearly 10 years noted German architect and engineer Frei Otto and his experiments in using lightweight tensile and membrane structures. Otto's design of Munich's Olympic Park for the 1972 Olympics and the temporary West German pavilion at the 1967 World's Fair in Montreal, Quebec, Canada, were heavily influenced by Patten's design of Melbourne's Myer Music Bowl.

The Sidney Myer Music Bowl is registered on the Victorian Heritage list for its cultural importance to Victoria, its architectural importance as the largest, purpose built, permanent outdoor performance venue in Australia and its engineering experimentation in new forms of construction involving use of membranes and a tensile structural system.

Capacity
There is a fixed seating area which can hold 2,030 people. Behind this area are sloping lawns which can accommodate up to 10,000. The stage area is 27.4 metres wide by 19.5 metres deep.

Major events
The bowl holds major events including Vision Australia's Carols by Candlelight, held every year on Christmas Eve, televised each year by the Nine Network.

Past major events held at The Bowl include Piknic Electronik, Music from the Home Front and Midsummer Festival.

Awards and nominations

Music Victoria Awards
The Music Victoria Awards are an annual awards night celebrating Victorian music. They commenced in 2006. Best Venue was introduced in 2016.

! 
|-
| 2021 Music Victoria Awards
| Sidney Myer Music Bowl
| Best Venue (Over 500 Capacity)
| 
| 
|-
| 2022 Music Victoria Awards
| Sidney Myer Music Bowl
| Best Large Venue (Metro)
| 
| 
|-

See also
 List of contemporary amphitheatres
 Make Poverty History Concert

References

External links

Heritage-listed buildings in Melbourne
Tensile membrane structures
Landmarks in Melbourne
Music venues in Melbourne
Amphitheaters
Buildings and structures completed in 1959
Australian National Heritage List
1959 establishments in Australia
Buildings and structures in the City of Melbourne (LGA)